Anouar Ayed (born 1978) is a Tunisian handball player. He was born in Moknine, Monastir. He has represented Tunisia at two Olympic Games: 2000 Sidney Olympics and the 2012 London Olympics, where the Tunisian team reached the quarter finals.

Honours

National Team
African Championship
 Winner: 2002 Morocco
 Winner: 2006 Tunisia
 Winner: 2010 Egypt
 Winner: 2012 Morocco

Summer Olympic Games
 Quarter-finalist: 2012 London

World Championship
 Fourth: 2005 Tunisia

 Silver Medalist: 2006 Sweden

Club
Tunisia National League
 Winner: 1999, 2002, 2003, 2015
Tunisia National Cup
 Winner: 2000, 2014, 2015
IHF Super Globe
 Fourth: 2013 Qatar
African Champions League
 Winner: 2014 Tunis
African Super Cup
 Winner: 2015 Libreville
Asian Champions League
 Bronze medalist: 2013 Doha
Arab Championship of Champions
 Winner: 2001 Morocco
Arab Championship of Winners' Cup
 Winner: 2000 
 Winner: 2001

Individual
 Historical scorer of the French LNH Division 1 (1204 goals)
 First player to reach 1000 goals in the LNH Division 1
 Highest goal scorer in one match in the LNH Division 1 (17 goals against Saint-Raphaël Var Handball 07-11-2004).

References

1978 births
Living people
People from Monastir Governorate
Tunisian male handball players
Olympic handball players of Tunisia
Handball players at the 2000 Summer Olympics
Handball players at the 2012 Summer Olympics
Competitors at the 2009 Mediterranean Games
Mediterranean Games bronze medalists for Tunisia
Mediterranean Games medalists in handball